Gori State Teaching University is a center for education and science in Shida Kartli in the Gori Municipality of Georgia, it was established as a result of merging of two high education institutions: Gori State University and Tskhinvali State University.

History
The Transcaucasian Teachers Seminary opened in Gori on 12 September 1876, which gave many well-known teachers to Georgia, including Vazha-Pshavela, Mikheil Tsinamdzgvrishvili, Ia Kargareteli, etc.

In August 1935, the university was opened as a two-year teaching institute, which in 1939 was reestablished as the Gori State Pedagogical Institute with four-year studies. The institute was named after the Georgian poet Nikoloz Baratashvili. In 1985, as a result of reorganization of the Gori N. Baratashvili State Pedagogical Institute, the Gori State Economic Institute, renamed in 1997 as Gori State Economic-Humanitarian Institute, was established. On 16 July 1999 the mentioned institution received university status.

The Tskhinvali State Pedagogic Institute was established in 1932 with one faculty: agro-biologic. In the following years, new faculties were added. Gradually it grew into an educational, scientific and cultural center. Since its foundation, the institute has had support from Georgian scientists.

After the Georgian-Ossetian conflict, 1991, Tskhinvali State Pedagogic Institute continued functioning in Gori city. Despite poor logistics the institute personnel kept the appropriate level of teaching process. On 16 June 2000 Tskhinvali State Pedagogical Institute received university status.

The above-mentioned institutions have over the years employed such distinguished scientists and public figures as George Akhvlediani, E. Metreveli, Arnold Chikobava, T. Uturgaidze, G. Zhordania, Zurab Sarjveladze, S. Gachechiladze, S. Khutsishvili, V. Topuria, Sergi Makalatia, G. Merkviladze, David Tevzadze, etc.

Current university
The main objective of the newly founded institution LEoPL-Gori University is to provide a quality education appropriate to modern requirements. The academic personnel consists of 106 professors, the university has 7 buildings, library and sports ground, computer labs and centers, etc.

From 2011 Acting Rector of the Gori State Teaching University is a professor Giorgi Sosiashvili.

The university building was damaged in a Russian air strike during the 2008 Russo-Georgian war.

Notable people 

 Vladimer Khinchegashvili (born 1991), 2016 Olympic Gold medalist and 2012 Olympic Silver medalist freestyle wrestler
Manana Chitishvili (born 1954), poet

References

External links
Official website

Gori State Teaching University
Buildings and structures in Gori, Georgia
Educational institutions established in 1876
1876 establishments in the Russian Empire